Oba Adeyeye Enitan Ogunwusi; (Ọjájá II)  (born 17 October 1974) is the 51st and current Ooni of Ife. He is the traditional ruler/monarch of the Yoruba kingdom of Ile-Ife. He ascended to the throne of his forebearers in 2015 succeeding the deceased Oba Okunade Sijuwade who was the 50th Ooni of Ife.

Ancestry 
Ọba Ọjájá II was born Prince Adeyeye Enitan of Giesi, one of the four royal families of the House of Oranmiyan. His paternal grandfather was Prince Joseph Olagbaju Adewole Ogunwusi, whose grandfather was Ọba Ọ̀ráyẹ̀gbà (also known as Ooni Orarigba or Orasigba) Ọjájá I, who was the 44th Ooni of Ife and ruled from 1878 to 1880. Through him, he is a direct descendant of Ooni Agbedegbede, who was a descendant of Ooni Giesi, (the progenitor of the Giesi royal House), and thus a descendant of Ọọni Lajodogun. Lajodogun was a son of Ọọni Lajamisan (or Lajemisin), who was a grandson of the legendary founder of the Oyo Empire Oranmiyan. Oranmiyan, was a son or grandson of the first Ooni of Ife, Oduduwa, thus Ọba Ọjájá II is a descendant of Odùdùwà, one of the Early rulers of Ilé Ifẹ̀. 

It was said that his birth was predicted years before he was conceived, Hence, the name Enitan was given by his mother while his grandfather named him Adeyeye, which means 'the crown befits the throne. He is the fifth child in a family of seven.

Education
He started his elementary education at Subuola Memorial Nursery and Primary School, Ibadan and Ibadan District Council, Akobo, Ibadan.
He then proceeded to Loyola College, Ibadan and later to St. Peters Secondary School, Ile-Ife, where he received his secondary school certificate (SSCE).
He graduated as an accountant from The Polytechnic, Ibadan.

Professional career
He is a member of the Institute of Chartered Accountants of Nigeria.
He is also an Associate Accounting Technician.
Oba Ogunwusi is a certified member of the Institute of Directors. He is also a member of the Global Real Estate Institute.
He holds a number of honorary doctorate degrees: one in Public Administration from the University of Nigeria, Nsukka and another in Law from Igbinedion University.

Oba Ogunwusi is the Chancellor at the University of Nigeria, Nsukka.

Selection and coronation 
Ooni Adeyeye Ogunwusi was selected from the Giesi Ruling House of Ile-Ife, amongst indigenes who were also heirs to the throne on 26 October 2015. He received his staff of office on 7 December 2015. He has been described as an 'astute entrepreneur driven by the need to turn impossibilities into possibilities. Oba Ogunwusi is the spiritual leader of the Yoruba people now saddled with the responsibility of making supplications to God and the Òrìṣà on behalf of his people and the world at large during annual festivals such as Olojo.

Achievements     
Shortly after his coronation, Ooni Ogunwusi met with the Alaafin of Oyo and by so doing initiated a new era in the history of the Yoruba States. He effectively broke the jinx of institutionalised discord between the thrones that had plagued Ile-Ife and Oyo for decades. The Oba is an advocate for the empowerment and emancipation of women and young people. He has transformed Ile-Ife into a tourist zone, with changes including the beautification, redesign and re-construction of the ancient city. Oba Ogunwusi is also a renowned philanthropist who is committed to humanity and an advocate for the less privileged. He has granted support over the years through the House of Oduduwa Foundation and, recently, through Hopes Alive Initiative.

Personal life
Ogunwusi has been involved in a number of publicised relationships.

He had his first child Adeola Aanuolouwapo Ogunwusi (born in May, 1994), with Omolara Olatubosun in Ibadan when they were both teenagers. They are co-parents. In November 2021, Omolara granted an interview in which she mentioned that he was an absentee father for the first years of their child's life. They were never married.

In 2008, Ogunwusi married Adebukola Bombata, from whom he separated in 2016. This was his first wife.

In March 2016, he married Zaynab Otiti Obanor the Benin Kingdom, Edo State. In 2017, Zaynab Otiti filed a divorced from Adeyeye Enitan Ogunwusi. The divorce was finalized in August, 2017.

In October 2018, he married Prophetess Morenike Naomi Oluwaseyi. In December 2021, Morenike Naomi posted on Instagram that they were separated, but the statement was contradicted hours later by the palace. Naomi continues to play a prominent role in public life.

Between September and October 2022, he married six wives; Mariam Anako, an Ebira of Kogi State origin, on 6 September 2022. Then, Elizabeth Opeoluwa Akinmuda, an Ondo indigene, was betrothed to him on 7 September 2022. Thereafter, he married Tobi Phillips, an Okitipupa, Ondo State native, as his third wife on 9 October 2022. On 14 October 2022, he married Ashley Afolashade Adegoke, an Ile-Ife Princess, as his fourth wife. And then on 20 October 2022, he married yet another Ile-Ife Princess, Ronke Ademiluyi, as the fifth wife. Asake Temitope Morenike Adesegun became the Ooni's sixth wife on October 24, 2022.

Awards
In October 2022, a Nigerian national honour of Commander of the Order of the Federal Republic (CFR) was conferred on him by President Muhammadu Buhari.

References

External links
 

Yoruba royalty
Nigerian business executives
Living people
Oonis of Ife
Yoruba businesspeople
Loyola College, Ibadan alumni
Accountants
1974 births
The Polytechnic, Ibadan alumni